Sripathi Sooriyarachchi (8 September 1962 – 9 February 2008) was a Sri Lankan politician, member of parliament, lawyer and former wrestling champion. 

He was fired from his cabinet position after he accused Sri Lanka's president Mahinda Rajapaksa of entering into an accord with LTTE. He had alleged he faced death threats. In March 2007, he was arrested on charges of misusing a government vehicle
He was associated with the Sri Lanka Freedom Party Mahajana faction.
His parliamentary web page identified him as a member of parliament for the district of Gampaha, a member of the United People's Freedom Alliance, and a  Buddhist. His death is highly controversial and believed to have inside hands from the government.

References 

1962 births
2008 deaths
Sri Lanka Navy officers
Sinhalese lawyers
Sri Lankan Buddhists
Members of the 13th Parliament of Sri Lanka
Naval and Maritime Academy graduates